Amanbek Manybekov (Russian: Аманбек Маныбеков, born 6 August 1995) is a footballer from Kyrgyzstan. He currently plays for Khorezm and the Kyrgyzstan national football team.

The adaptable defender made his national team debut in the starting eleven against Turkmenistan.

References

External links
 

1995 births
Living people
Kyrgyzstani footballers
Kyrgyzstan international footballers
Association football defenders
Footballers at the 2018 Asian Games
Asian Games competitors for Kyrgyzstan